The Fusiliers' Arch is a monument which forms part of the Grafton Street entrance to St Stephen's Green park, in Dublin, Ireland. Erected in 1907, it was dedicated to the officers, non-commissioned officers and enlisted men of the Royal Dublin Fusiliers who fought and died in the Second Boer War (1899–1902).

Construction
Funded by public subscription, the arch was designed by John Howard Pentland and built by Henry Laverty and Sons. Thomas Drew consulted on the design and construction.

The proportions of the structure are said to be modelled on the Arch of Titus in Rome. The internal dimensions of the arch are 5.6 m high and approximately 3.7 m wide (18 by 12 ft).

The main structure of the arch is granite, with the inscriptions carried out in limestone and a bronze adornment on the front of the arch.

Dedication and reception

The arch was commissioned to commemorate the four battalions (two regular and two militia) of the Royal Dublin Fusiliers that served in the Second Boer war. The names of 222 dead are inscribed on the underside of the arch.

The construction of the arch coincided with a time of political and social change in Ireland, and the colonial and imperial background to the dedication were anathema to a burgeoning nationalist movement – who labelled the structure "Traitor's Gate".  Though damaged in a cross-fire between the Irish Citizen Army and British forces during the 1916 Easter Rising, the arch remains "one of the few colonialist monuments in Dublin not blown up" in Ireland's post-independence history.

Text
Engraved on the western face is the Latin text, "To its strongest soldiers, Dublin dedicates this monument, 1907." (Eblana is a name that appears on Ptolemy's 2nd century AD map of Ireland, traditionally taken as a Latin name for Dublin, although it more likely refers to a site further north, around Loughshinny.) Six battlefields are inscribed on the arch: 
Talana: Battle of Talana Hill, 20 October 1899 
Ladysmith: Battle of Ladysmith, 30 October 1899
Colenso: Battle of Colenso, 15 December 1899
Tugela Heights: Battle of the Tugela Heights, 14–27 February 1900  
Hartshill: Hart's Hill, 23 February 1900, part of the Relief of Ladysmith
Laings Nek: Laing's Nek was scene of intense fighting 2–9 June 1900. Not to be confused with the more famous Battle of Laing's Nek (1881)

Notes and references

Triumphal arches
Buildings and structures in Dublin (city)
Second Boer War memorials
St Stephen's Green
Buildings and structures completed in 1907
20th-century architecture in the Republic of Ireland